Psoralea arborea is a species of legume in the family Fabaceae. It is found in South Africa.

References

Sources
 Victor, J.E. 2005. Psoralea arborea Sims. National Assessment: Red List of South African Plants version 2020.1. Retrieved 21 July 2021.

Psoraleeae
Flora of South Africa
Flora of Swaziland
Data deficient plants
Taxonomy articles created by Polbot
Plants described in 1819